Équipe Ligier is a motorsport team, best known for its Formula One team that operated from  to . The team was founded in 1968 by former French rugby union player Guy Ligier as a sports car manufacturer.

Sports car origins
After retiring from racing following the death of his friend Jo Schlesser, Guy Ligier decided to found his own team and had engineer Michel Tétu develop a sports car named JS1 (Schlesser's initials). The Cosworth-powered JS1 took wins at Albi and Montlhéry in 1970, but retired at Le Mans and from the Tour Automobile de France.

For 1971, Ligier had the JS1 developed into the JS2 and JS3. The JS2 was homologated for road use and used a Maserati V6 engine, while the JS3 was an open-top sports-prototype powered by a Cosworth DFV V8 engine. The JS3 won at Montlhéry in 1971 but failed to finish the minimum distance at Le Mans. Therefore, it was retired, and Ligier installed the Cosworth DFV in the JS2 road car, finishing second overall at Le Mans in 1975. Guy Ligier then switched his efforts into Formula One.

Formula One
This is generally considered to have been the first all-French victory in the Formula One World Championship as well as the first Formula One victory for a French team and a French engine.

The deal with Matra ceased in 1979 and Ligier built a Cosworth-powered wing-car, the Ligier JS11. The JS11 began the season winning the first two races in the hands of Laffite. However, the JS11 faced serious competition when Williams and Ferrari introduced aerodynamically modified cars. The rest of the season was less successful for the French marque.

The JS11 and its successors made Ligier one of the top teams through the early 1980s. Despite substantial sponsorship from Talbot (known officially as 
Around this time, they were testing a Matra V6 turbocharged engine, which never raced. Thanks to the political support of Ligier long-time friend François Mitterrand, in the mid-1980s, the team benefitted from a free Renault turbo engine deal. This, along with sponsorship from companies such as Loto and Elf Aquitaine, made the team more competitive, though not a frontrunner. When Renault left the sport in 1986, Ligier was left without a bona fide engine supplier. An abortive collaboration with Alfa Romeo (due to René Arnoux's harsh criticism on the Alfa Romeo engines) was followed by customer engine deals with Megatron (who provided them with rebadged BMW M12 engines), Judd and Cosworth and then works contracts with Lamborghini, Renault and Mugen-Honda.

Between 1987 and 1991, the team struggled, failing to score points in 1988, 1990 and 1991, and at the 1988 San Marino Grand Prix neither René Arnoux nor Stefan Johansson qualified for the race, the first time in team history that neither car made the grid. In 1990, when fellow team Larrousse were disqualified after claiming their chassis was built by themselves, while in fact it was built by Lola Cars, Ligier moved up into 10th place in the Constructors' Championship, which gave them subsidized travel benefits, despite actually not being classified due to a lack of points.

In 1993 the team enjoyed an upswing when Guy Ligier sold the team to Cyril de Rouvre after a disappointing 1992 season when they once again failed to fulfil their potential despite being supplied with the same works Renault engines as the dominant Williams team. Surprisingly, the team was somewhat more competitive during this period, in part due to the talents of aerodynamicist Frank Dernie and engineer Loïc Bigois. In the last years Ligier had little public support and lacked funds.

In , de Rouvre sold the team to Flavio Briatore and Tom Walkinshaw. Other organisations bidded to purchase Ligier, including Alain Prost and a consortium consisting of Hughes de Chaunac and Philippe Streiff, with the support of the similarly Renault-powered Williams F1 team, who intended to turn Ligier into a 'junior' team. 

In 1995, Ligier switched from the Renault engines as they had been passed/sold on to the Benetton Formula Team, the reason given was because Flavio Briatore had purchased the team and had persuaded Renault to switch the supplies to the defending champions, this was in light of Michael Schumacher testing a Ligier - Renault car late into the 1994 season which convinced Renault to support Benetton along with Michael. Ligier's replacement engine supplier was Mugen Honda who in previous seasons with Footwork and Lotus did not initially have the best reliability, though the engine was less reliable than the previous Renault engine supply the 1995 season turned out to be surprisingly successful for the team while allowing them to score points on a more consistent basis combined with securing 2 podiums for the season, Martin Brundle securing 3rd place at Belgium and Olivier Panis securing 2nd at the last race of the season in Australia.

The Mugen-Honda-powered JS43 turned out to be a well balanced car, if not on par with the Williams entries. It became a surprise winner as well, with the team taking the chequered flag with Olivier Panis at the Monaco Grand Prix, albeit in a race of heavy attrition, with only three cars finishing. It was the first "all-French" victory at Monaco since René Dreyfus in Bugatti in 1930. This ended a nearly fifteen-year-long winless-streak for the Ligier team, the longest of any uninterruptedly existing team between two wins (some teams like Renault, Honda or Mercedes had much longer periods between two wins, but did not exist as a Grand Prix team for most of their respective periods between two wins, and teams with a name change (Tyrrell / BAR / Honda and Jordan / Midland / Spyker / Force India / Racing Point) have longer streaks).

The Ligier name last appeared in Formula One at the 1996 Japanese Grand Prix.

The team traditionally used numbers 25 and 26.

After Formula One
In 2004, Ligier returned to motorsport after acquiring Automobiles Martini. Tico Martini had designed a Formula 3 chassis that was introduced at the 2004 Paris Motor Show as the Ligier JS47, but with the F3 market cornered by Dallara, the car only raced in the minor Recaro F3 Cup.

In 2005 Ligier introduced a "gentlemen driver" sports car, the JS49, a sport prototype made for the 2000 cc CN class, which can be used in the V de V Challenge.

Complete Formula One World Championship results
(key)

Notes

External links

 Official website 

Ligier
Formula One constructors
Formula One entrants
24 Hours of Le Mans teams
Vehicle manufacturing companies established in 1968
French auto racing teams
French racecar constructors
French Formula 3 teams
1968 establishments in France
Auto racing teams established in 1968
Auto racing teams disestablished in 1996